Thomas Grey Wicker (June 18, 1926 – November 25, 2011) was an American journalist.  He was a political reporter and columnist for The New York Times.

Background and education
Wicker was born on June 18, 1926 in Hamlet, North Carolina to Delancey David, a railroad freight conductor, and Esta Cameron Wicker. He served in the Navy in World War II. Wicker was a 1948 graduate of the University of North Carolina. He won a Nieman Fellowship at Harvard University in 1957. In 1993, he returned to Harvard, where he was a fellow at Harvard Kennedy School.

Career

The New York Times
Wicker began working in professional journalism in 1949, as editor of the small-town Sandhill Citizen in Aberdeen, North Carolina.  He eventually worked for other newspapers, including The Winston-Salem Journal and The Nashville Tennessean.  By the early 1960s, he had joined The New York Times. At the Times, he became well known as a political reporter; among other accomplishments, he wrote the paper's November 23, 1963 lead story of the assassination of President Kennedy, having ridden in a press bus in the Dallas motorcade that accompanied Kennedy. Wicker was a shrewd observer of the Washington, D.C. scene. In that capacity, his influential "In The Nation" column ran in the Times from 1966 through his retirement in 1991. In an exit-interview Q & A with fellow Times reporter R. W. Apple, he reflected on one primary lesson of his years in the capital. Apple asked whether Wicker had "any heroes" in political life.
I think it tends to work the other way. Which doesn't mean that I look at all those people with contempt—quite the opposite. But the journalist's perspective makes you see the feet of clay and the warts, and that's a good thing. I found them in many cases to be truly engaging human beings and admirable persons but not really, in the long run, impeccable heroes, or even just heroes without the "impeccable." We should try to see people as clearly as we can. Then if a hero does come into view, why, we can give him his due.

Books

Wicker wrote many different books throughout his life. He is the author of several books about U.S. presidents including: 
 Kennedy Without Tears: The Man Beneath the Myth (1964)
 JFK & LBJ: The Influence of Personality Upon Politics (1966)
 One of Us: Richard Nixon and the American Dream (1991)
 Dwight D. Eisenhower (2002)  
 George Herbert Walker Bush (2004)  
Other works Wicker penned include:
 The Kingpin (1953), a novel about politics
 The Devil Must (1957), a novel
 The Judgment (1961), a novel
 Facing the Lions (1973), a novel about a presidential campaign involving a candidate modeled on Sen. Estes Kefauver
 A Time to Die: The Attica Prison Revolt (1975), this book recounted the events at the Attica Correctional Facility in Attica, New York, during September 1971; it received an Edgar Award from the Mystery Writers of America for Best Fact Crime book and inspired a 1980 made-for-TV movie
 On Press: A Top Reporters Life In, And Reflection On, American Journalism (1978)
 Unto This Hour (1984), a novel of the American Civil War, during the Second Battle of Bull Run (1862)
 Donovan's Wife (1992), a novel about the sleazy side of politics 
 Prison Writing in 20th-Century America (1992)
 Tragic Failure: Racial Integration in America (1996)
 Easter Lilly: A Novel of the South Today (1998), a novel about a murder in the South 
 On the Record: An Insider’s Guide to Journalism (2001) 
 Shooting Star: The Brief Arc of Joe McCarthy (2006)

In addition, Wicker penned three standalone detective novels under the pseudonym “Paul Connolly”: 
 Get Out of Town (1951), 
 Tears Are for Angels (1952)
 So Far, So Evil (1955)

Politics
Wicker's work earned him a place on the master list of Nixon political opponents. He wrote the essay on Richard Nixon for the book Character Above All: Ten Presidents from FDR to George Bush (1995). Wicker was mentioned in a 60 Minutes report from the 1970s which detailed how, along with other journalists and members of Congress who supported desegregation busing, Wicker and the others nevertheless sent their children to DC private schools.

NSA monitoring of Wicker's communications
In a secret operation code-named "Project MINARET," the National Security Agency (NSA) monitored the communications of leading Americans, including Wicker and other prominent U.S. journalists, Senators Frank Church and Howard Baker, such civil rights leaders as Martin Luther King Jr., and prominent U.S. athletes who criticized the U.S. war in Vietnam. A review by NSA of the NSA's Minaret program concluded that Minaret was "disreputable if not outright illegal."

Death
Wicker died from an apparent heart attack, on November 25, 2011 at the age of 85.

References

External links

Ubben Lecture at DePauw University; March 12, 1993
Tom Wicker biography via PBS.

Tom Wicker papers, Manuscripts and Archives Division, The New York Public Library.

1926 births
2011 deaths
American male journalists
American historical novelists
Edgar Award winners
The New York Times writers
Nieman Fellows
Novelists from North Carolina
People from Hamlet, North Carolina
People from Rochester, Vermont
20th-century American novelists
21st-century American non-fiction writers
American male novelists
20th-century American male writers
Novelists from New York (state)
20th-century American non-fiction writers
21st-century American male writers